Dean Lennox Kelly (born 30 November 1975) is an English actor. He is known for his television roles as Kev Ball in Shameless and Meredith Rutter in Jamestown.

Early life
Kelly is from Lytham St Annes, Lancashire. He trained at the Bristol Old Vic Theatre School, where his classmates included Richard Coyle and Oded Fehr.  He is the brother of actor Craig Kelly.

Career

Kelly is best known for his role playing Kev Ball in Channel 4's Shameless. Other television credits include Maisie Raine, Border Cafe, Tipping the Velvet, ShakespeaRe-Told and The Worst Week of My Life. He also had parts in the films The Lowdown and Mike Bassett: England Manager. In 2006 he took a lead role in BBC One's drama series Sorted, which is about a group of postmen. On 1 January 2007 he starred in ITV Drama Dead Clever alongside Suranne Jones. He left Shameless after the first episode of the fourth series along with his co-star and on screen girlfriend, Maxine Peake. In 2007, he appeared as William Shakespeare in the episode "The Shakespeare Code" of the BBC One science-fiction series Doctor Who. In March 2008, he appeared as one of Jesus' disciples, James, in the BBC drama The Passion, a retelling of the last days of Jesus' life. In May, he appeared as Hedley, the landlord of the local pub in BBC drama The Invisibles, a story of two retired crooks returning to Britain from abroad. Hedley then joins the twosome later in the series. In January and February 2009, he appeared in two episodes of Being Human as a werewolf named Tully.

He starred in Frequently Asked Questions About Time Travel a comedy sci-fi film with Chris O'Dowd, Marc Wootton and Anna Faris, ITV drama Married Single Other with Ralf Little and Miranda Raison, the BBC mini-series Cranford as a poor man struggling to feed his six children and wife, and in Robin Hood as Robin's father, Malcolm.

In 2002, he starred as Private Willie McNess in the major motion picture Deathwatch, a 2002 European horror film directed by Michael J. Bassett.

He narrated a documentary style DVD about the Great Britain national rugby league team during the 2005 Rugby League Tri-Nations, titled League of Their Own. He was also narrator of the first couple of seasons of The Real Hustle.

In 2009 he starred alongside his brother in the ITV1 drama Collision which ran over five consecutive nights in November. In 2010 he played industrialist Christoper Rawson in BBC drama The Secret Diaries of Miss Anne Lister. In 2013 he played Ian, the boyfriend of the title character, in the BBC One drama series Frankie. In 2013 he took on the role of Danny, a soldier facing his fears in the short film On The Bridge, based on a true story and shot entirely on Waterloo Bridge.

Empire had announced that Kelly would be voicing the role of John Lennon for the then-upcoming 3D remake of Yellow Submarine before the project was cancelled. However, in late 2011, he appeared as the narrator on the interactive Apple iBooks version of Yellow Submarine.

In 2015 he appeared in the BBC TV series Death in Paradise.

Kelly is the narrator of Gold Rush which he has narrated since 2010. He has also narrated 10,000 BC on Channel 5 since 2015., and also narrated Amsterdam Nights airing on 3e in The Republic of Ireland on Saturday nights.

Filmography

Film

Television

Stage

References

External links
 

English male television actors
1975 births
Living people
People from Lytham St Annes
Alumni of Bristol Old Vic Theatre School
Male actors from Lancashire